Necip Memili (born 27 May 1980) is a Turkish actor. He is a graduate of Çukurova University State Conservatory with a degree in theatre studies.

In 1999, he started working as an amateur actor for Adana Seyhan Municipal Theatre. After graduating, he moved to Istanbul. There he joined the cast of Uçurtmanın Kuyruğu, a play written by Savaş Dinçel and directed by Erdal Cindoruk. His main television debut came with a role in the series Arka Sokaklar. He then appeared in recurring roles in Hanımın Çiftliği, Yalan Dünya, Muhteşem Yüzyıl: Kösem and Dolunay. His performance in Şahsiyet was praised by critics.

In 2018, he joined the cast of Show TV's Çukur, portraying the character of Cumali.

Filmography

References

External links 
 
 

Living people
1980 births
Turkish male television actors
Turkish male stage actors
Turkish male film actors
Çukurova University alumni
People from Adana